Kindel is the surname of the following people

Charlie Kindel, American tech executive
George John Kindel (1855-1930), American politician
Steve Kindel (born in 1977), Canadian soccer player

Pseudonym
Joaquín del Palacio (Kindel) (1905-1989), Spanish photographer

See also
Steve Kindel, historic automobile showroom in Pasadena, California